Lever Bank Bleach Works was a Bleach Works at Ladyshore, near Little Lever, Bolton.  The works was owned by Thomas Ridgway & Sons.  Former British Prime Minister Tony Blair would appear to be a direct descendant of this family.

Location
The works was located between the Manchester Bolton & Bury Canal to the north, and the River Irwell to the south, in the area known as Ladyshore in the Irwell Valley.

Accessed from Ladyshore Bridge, over the canal, the cobbled pathway is still very much evident.  Stanchions across the river still stand although the bridge/pipework they supported no longer exists.  A weir was built on the nearby River Irwell and water diverted through a small channel into a reservoir.  High quality stone walls are still evident along the banks of the river.

The weir collapsed in June 2012.

References

External links
Historic images of Lever Bank Bleach Works

History of the Metropolitan Borough of Bolton
Irwell Valley